Christmas Like This is the first Christmas album by Christian singer Ayiesha Woods.  It was released on November 10, 2009.

Track listing

Awards

The album was nominated for a Dove Award for Christmas Album of the Year at the 42nd GMA Dove Awards.

References

External links
Ayiesha Woods
Gotee Records

Gotee Records albums
2009 Christmas albums
Ayiesha Woods albums
Christmas albums by American artists